Epic Scrap Metal is the Norwegian rock band BigBang's eighth studio album. It was released on March 4, 2011 in Norway and jumped straight into #1 on its week of release, staying on top of the Norwegian Albums Chart for 4 consecutive weeks.

Overview
The album's title draws upon a metal recycling plant in California, named "Star Scrap Metal". Among the guest artist appearances is a duet with U.S. singer Lissie.

Track listing
 "How Things Rot" – 2:02
 "Everybody and Their Broken Hearts" – 4:15
 "Cigarette" – 3:41
 "Deserve Everything" – 2:56
 "New Woman" – 4:33
 "No One" – 3:06
 "Cities of the Plain" – 4:57
 "Don't Kill My Buzz" – 3:25
 "Nothing Finished Yet" – 4:42
 "Cape" – 4:38
 "Don't Believe in Change" – 4:01
 "Epic Scrap Metal" – 4:43
 "Magic Hour" – (bonus track on iTunes and limited deluxe edition) - 7:32

Personnel
Øystein Greni - Lead vocals, guitars. bass, drums
Nikolai Hængsle Eilertsen - Bass, piano, vocals
Olaf Olsen - drums, vocals
Joshua Moore - Piano on tracks #2, #4, #10 & #11
Lissie - vocals on "No One"
Thom Hell - vocals on "Cities of the Plains"

References

2011 albums
Bigbang (Norwegian band) albums